Eric McLuhan (19 January 1942 – 18 May 2018) was a communications theorist and media ecologist, son of Marshall McLuhan.

Biography 
Eric McLuhan was the eldest of Marshall McLuhan's six children. He received his BSc in Communications from Wisconsin State University in 1972 and his M.A. and PhD in English Literature from the University of Dallas in 1980 and 1982. In 2007, he received the Neil Postman Award for Career Achievement in Public Intellectual Activity from the Media Ecology Association. In 2011, the University of St. Michael's College in Toronto, Canada awarded him an L.L.D. of Sacred Letters.

Eric McLuhan coined the term 'media ecology' while teaching at Fordham University in 1967-68 with his father Marshall McLuhan. According to Eric: "Media Ecology is a term I invented when we were at Fordham. I discussed it with Postman and he ran with it." 'Interview with Eric McLuhan' [Laureano Ralon, 2010] 

Marshall and Eric McLuhan co-authored the books Laws of Media: The New Science (1990), Media and Formal Cause (2011), and Theories of Communication (2011). According to McLuhan associate Dean Motter, Eric also collaborated with his father on some books as a ghostwriter.

His teaching experiences were in the McLuhan Program in Culture and Technology at the University of Toronto and with the McLuhan Program International. He was Director of Media Studies at the Harris Institute for the Arts in Toronto for 17 years. Prior to that he taught and tutored at York University, Dawson College and Ontario College of Art. Likewise, he was a founding partner at McLuhan and Davies Communications. He also performed the original Fordham Experiment.

McLuhan was the author of Electric Language (1998), The Role of Thunder in Finnegans Wake (1997) and The Sensus Communis, Synesthesia, and the Soul: An Odyssey (2015). He was also editor of the journal McLuhan Studies and has overseen several collections of his father's work: The Book of Probes (2011), Marshall McLuhan Unbound (2005, with Terrence Gordon), The Medium and the Light (2010); and the co-editor of Essential McLuhan (1997, with Frank Zingrone).

Recent work included a collaboration with mime Wayne D. Constantineau, produced in a series called The Human Equation (BPS Books), which curiously included a board game. Also forthcoming is: The Dance of the Ages: Egyptian Art of the Old Kingdom and Its Relevance to the Twenty-First Century, Cambridge Scholars Press.

He lived in Ontario, Canada, continuing in retirement to work on new books, projects & collections, his father's works, his own and with collaborators.

He died in Bogotá, a day after delivering the inaugural speech for the Doctorate in Communication at University of La Sabana.

List of works
City as Classroom (with Marshall McLuhan, Kathryn Hutchon), 1977
Laws of Media: The New Science (with Marshall McLuhan), U of Toronto Press, 1988
The Role of Thunder in Finnegans Wake, U of Toronto Press, 1997
Electric Language: Understanding the Present, Stoddart, 1998
The Human Equation, Book I: The Constant in Human Development and Culture from Pre-Literacy to Post-Literacy (with W. D. Constantineau), BPS Books, 2010
Media and Formal Cause (with Marshall McLuhan), NeoPoeisis Press, 2011
Theories of Communication (with Marshall McLuhan), Peter Lang, 2011
The Human Equation, Book II: The Science of Investigation (with W. D. Constantineau), BPS Books, 2011
The Human Equation, Book III: Know Thyself: Action and Perception (with W. D. Constantineau), BPS Books, 2012
The Human Equation, Book IV: Mime and Media I (with W. D. Constantineau), BPS Books, 2016 [Forthcoming]
The Human Equation, Book V: Mime and Media II (with W. D. Constantineau), BPS Books, 2016 [Forthcoming]
Cynic Satire, Cambridge Scholars Publishing, 2015
The Sensus Communis: Synesthesia, and the Soul, BPS Books, 2015
Editor
Essential McLuhan (with F. Zingrone), Stoddart, 1995
Who Was Marshall McLuhan? (with F. Zingrone, W. Constantineau), Stoddart, 1996
The Medium and the Light: Writings on Religion by Marshall McLuhan, (With Jacek Schlarek) Stoddart, 1998
The Book of Probes (with W. Kuhns), Gingko Press, 2004
McLuhan Unbound, Gingko Press, 2005

See also
Tetrad of media effects

References

External links
 University of Toronto: Marshall McLuhan Studies: About Eric McLuhan
 Eric McLuhan homepage
 The New Nomads: Eight Characteristics of the Electric Mass Audience by Eric McLuhan
 Eric McLuhan in conversation with Laureano Ralón. Figure/Ground. August 1st, 2010

1941 births
2018 deaths
Marshall McLuhan
Mass media theorists
Communication scholars
Canadian Roman Catholics
Mass media scholars
Rhetoric theorists
American educational theorists
20th-century Canadian male writers
20th-century Canadian non-fiction writers
21st-century Canadian male writers
21st-century Canadian non-fiction writers